A patty or burger (in British English) is a flattened, usually round, serving of ground meat and/or legumes, grains, vegetables, or meat alternatives. Patties are found in multiple cuisines throughout the world.

In British and American English, minced meat that is formed into a disc is called a burger, whether it is in a bread roll or not. The word "patty" is also used in American English but almost unknown in British English.

The ingredients are compacted and shaped, usually cooked, and served in various ways. Some foods termed "patties" use ingredients inside a pastry crust that is then baked or fried. Some patties are breaded, then baked or fried.

In London, since the late 1980s, the Jamaican patty, similar to the Cornish pastie, is a common food item.

Etymology 
The term originated in the 17th century as an English alteration of the French word pâté. According to the OED, it is related to the word pasty, which is various ingredients encased in pastry.

Terminology 
The term "patty" is used in many varieties of English, but less frequently in Britain and Ireland than in the United States. Merriam-Webster defines it as "a small flat cake of chopped food", Cambridge as "pieces of food, especially meat, formed into a thin, circular shape and then usually cooked". In some countries, patties may be called "discs."

Similar-shaped cakes not made from ground beef may also be called "burgers": "fish burgers" may be made from reshaped mechanically separated meat. Patties made from chicken meat may be called chicken patties.

Veggie burger patties are made without meat and instead use legumes, grains, other mixed vegetables, and/or soy products such as tofu or tempeh or seitan, a product made of wheat gluten, often mixed with a binding agent.

Variations and serving styles

Croquettes 

Patties can be breaded and deep-fried, producing croquettes such as crab cakes. In Ireland, traditional chippers often serve batter burgers (a beef-based patty dipped in batter and deep fried). A batter burger served as a sandwich is called a wurly burger, and is believed to have been invented by the Mona Lisa chipper in Crumlin, Dublin. In Japan the Korokke is an example. Rissoles are meat (typically beef), or fish and other ingredients, coated in breadcrumbs or less frequently battered, and deep-fried; they are found in various European cuisines.

Cutlets 

Patties can be treated as a cutlet and eaten with a knife and fork in dishes like Salisbury steak, the German Hamburg steak, or the Serbo-Croatian pljeskavica, or with chopsticks in dishes such as Songjeong tteok-galbi. Other examples include the Russian Pozharsky cutlet.

Fritters 
Aloo tikki is a potato patty that originated in the Indian subcontinent. A related dish is ragda pattice, which covers the potato patty in a gravy.

An arepa is a dish of maize and other ingredients shaped into a patty and griddled; it has been eaten in parts of Central and South American since pre-Columbian times.

Quenelles 
 Gefilte fish is often served as a quenelle, a patty shaped into a flattened egg.

Sandwich fillings 

Patties are often served as sandwiches, typically in buns, making a type of sandwich called a "burger", or a hamburger if the patty is made from ground beef, or sometimes between slices of bread. An American patty melt is a ground beef patty topped with melted cheese (typically Swiss) served on toasted bread, typically rye.

In Ireland, traditional chippers often serve sandwiches called spice burgers. The spice burger is made to a specific recipe developed in the early 1950s by pork butcher Maurice Walsh, and later manufactured and sold by Walsh Family Foods Limited and then Keystone Foods.

In Japan and Korea, a ground beef patty is sometimes served as a sandwich on a "bun" made of compressed rice; the sandwich is called a rice burger.

Tartares 

Some patties, like steak tartare and Middle Eastern kibbeh nayeh, are served raw.

Turnovers 
Patties can be encased in pastry and baked or fried, producing turnovers such as Cornish pasties. A Jamaican patty is cooked, spiced ground beef sealed inside a pastry crust and baked.

Commercial production

Commercially produced patties are machine-formed.

With mass-produced patties, it is not uncommon to find them with seemingly abnormal shapes or a bumpy perimeter. These groove-like bumps are caused by the machine that forms the patties. They are used in production to keep the patties in line, so they will not fall off the assembly line, and can be manipulated by the various machines. In other boxed patties, small punctures can be seen in the top and bottom sides of the patty. These punctures are there for similar reasons.

See also

Kofta, a related dish that is formed into patties or balls
 List of hamburgers
 Meatball, a similar dish but rounded rather than flattened

References

World cuisine
Ground meat